Festuca petraea is a species of grass endemic to the Azores, Portugal. It is found in coastal cliffs and rocks. It is present in all of the nine islands.

References

petraea
Endemic flora of the Azores